The Alcatel OT 300 is a discontinued, low range mobile phone created by Alcatel and was introduced in Q1 2000. Its monochrome screen has a maximum resolution of 49x96 pixels and the phone includes a NiMH 650 mAh rechargeable battery giving it a standby time of 165 hours.

Related models are OT 301, OT 302 and OT 303. It's being referred as the Alcatel BE-4 on the label.

References

300
Alcatel mobile phones
Mobile phones introduced in 2000